Montgomery County is a county in the U.S. state of Texas. As of the 2020 U.S. census, the county had a population of 620,443. The county seat is Conroe. The county was created by an act of the Congress of the Republic of Texas on December 14, 1837, and is named for the town of Montgomery. Between 2000 and 2010, its population grew by 55%, the 24th-fastest rate of growth of any county in the United States. Between 2010 and 2020, its population grew by 36%.  According to the U.S. Census Bureau, the July 1, 2021, estimated population is 648,886.

Montgomery County is part of the Houston-The Woodlands-Sugar Land, TX Metropolitan Statistical Area.

Geography

Adjacent counties
 Walker County (north)
 San Jacinto County (northeast)
 Liberty County (east)
 Harris County (south)
 Waller County (west)
 Grimes County (northwest)

National protected area
 Sam Houston National Forest (partial)

Communities

Cities 

 Cleveland (most of the city is in Liberty County)
 Conroe (county seat)
 Cut and Shoot
 Houston (most of the city is in Harris County)
 Magnolia
 Montgomery
 Oak Ridge North
 Panorama Village
 Patton Village
 Roman Forest
 Shenandoah
 Splendora
 Willis
 Woodbranch

Towns
 Stagecoach
 Woodloch

Census-designated places
 Pinehurst
 Porter Heights
 The Woodlands (small part of the CDP in Harris County)

Unincorporated communities

 Chateau Woods (former city)
 Decker Prairie
 Dobbin
 Egypt
 Grangerland
 Imperial Oaks
 New Caney
 Porter
 River Plantation
 Spring (larger part in Harris County, which includes the CDP part)
 Tamina

Demographics

Note: the US Census treats Hispanic/Latino as an ethnic category. This table excludes Latinos from the racial categories and assigns them to a separate category. Hispanics/Latinos can be of any race.

As of the 2010 census, there were 455,746 people, 162,530 households, and 121,472 families residing in the county. The population density was 423 people per square mile (163/km2). There were 177,647 housing units at an average density of 165 per square mile (64/km2). > 

In 2010, the racial makeup of the county was 83.5% White, 4.3% Black or African American, 0.7% Native American, 2.1% Asian, 0.1% Pacific Islander, 7.0% from other races, and 2.3% from two or more races. 20.8% of the population were Hispanic or Latino of any race. At the 2020 census, the racial and ethnic makeup was 59.86% non-Hispanic white, 5.51% African American or Black, 0.30% Native American, 3.45% Asian alone, 0.10% Pacific Islander, 0.41% some other race, 3.92% multiracial, and 26.45% Hispanic or Latino American of any race.

At the 2010 census there were 162,530 households, out of which 36.20% had children under the age of 18 living with them, 59.50% were married couples living together, 10.60% had a female householder with no husband present, 4.70% had a male householder with no wife present, and 25.30% were non-families. 20.60% of all households were made up of individuals, and 6.50% had someone living alone who was 65 years of age or older. The average household size was 2.78 and the average family size was 3.22.

In the county, 27.60% of the population was under the age of 18, 8.00% from 18 to 24, 27.40% from 25 to 44, 26.60% from 45 to 64, and 10.40% who were 65 years of age or older. The median age was 36.1 years. For every 100 females, there were 98.29 males. For every 100 females age 18 and over, there were 95.94 males.

At the 2000 census, the median income for a household in the county was $50,864, and the median income for a family was $58,983. Males had a median income of $42,400 versus $28,270 for females. The per capita income for the county was $24,544. About 7.10% of families and 9.40% of the population were below the poverty line, including 10.90% of those under age 18 and 10.10% of those age 65 or over.

From 2010 to 2016, 54% of all vehicle-related fatalities in the county were related to the use of controlled substances, including alcohol, marijuana, methamphetamine and synthetic drugs. According to Tyler Dunman, former Montgomery County assistant district attorney, approximately 60-70% of all crime in the county is connected to substance abuse.

Politics 
Since the late 20th century, when many white conservative voters shifted from the Democratic to the Republican party, Montgomery County has become one of the most strongly Republican counties in Texas. In 1948, “States’ Rights” candidate Strom Thurmond, previously a Democrat, won more than 29 percent of the vote; Montgomery gave him his fourth-strongest showing in Texas. The county has not been won by a Democratic presidential candidate since 1964, when native Texan and favorite son Lyndon Johnson won 60.9% of the county's vote. In and after the late 1960s, many southern white Democrats became disaffected with the national party by social and cultural changes, and shifted to the Republican Party. In 1968 Alabama governor George Wallace, a longtime Democrat, ran as a third-party candidate and won Montgomery County. He had announced supporting segregation in 1963, as the Civil Rights Movement gained momentum. 

As a measure of how Republican the county has become, it rejected Southerner Jimmy Carter in 1976 even as Carter carried Texas. To date, Carter is the last Democrat to win even 40 percent of the county's vote. In 1992, Ross Perot, another third-party candidate, received more votes here than did Democratic candidate Bill Clinton, a Southerner and native of Arkansas. In 2004, county voters gave 78.1 percent of their vote to Republican candidate George W. Bush; whites comprised a large majority of voters at the time. In 2008, 75.8% of the voters supported the Republican ticket of John McCain and Sarah Palin.

In 2016, this was the only county in the United States where Republican nominee Donald Trump won against Democratic nominee Hillary Clinton by a margin of greater than 100,000 votes, specifically 104,000 vote margin. Since the late 20th century, Texas's suburbs, especially those of Houston, Dallas and Austin, have supported Democratic candidates in greater proportion. However, Montgomery County has largely bucked this trend; it has given GOP candidates 70 percent or more of the vote since 2000, although, Joe Biden turned in the best showing for the Democrats since 1996 by getting 27% of the vote, showing a very slight trend towards the Democrats.  However, Montgomery County gave Trump another 100,000 vote margin, specifically a 119,000 vote margin over Biden, a greater raw vote margin than against Clinton in 2016. On the Republican side, even though Donald Trump won with 71% of the vote, he still turned in the worst showing for a Republican candidate since 1992, significantly reduced from Mitt Romney's nearly 80% margin in 2012. Despite this, Donald Trump expanded his raw vote margin from 2016.

United States Congress

Texas Legislature

Texas Senate

Texas House of Representatives

Education

Public schools
Several school districts operate public schools in the county:
 Conroe ISD
 Magnolia ISD
 Montgomery ISD
 New Caney ISD
 Richards ISD (partial)
 Splendora ISD
 Tomball ISD (partial)
 Willis ISD (partial)

Private schools

Pre-K to 12
 Covenant Christian School
 Christ Community School
 Esprit International School
 The Woodlands Christian Academy
 The John Cooper School
 The Woodlands Preparatory School
 Porter Christian Academy
 Cunae International School
 Legacy Preparatory Christian Academy
 Willis Classical Academy
Pre-K to 8
 St. Anthony Of Padua Catholic School of the Roman Catholic Archdiocese of Galveston-Houston

The closest Catholic high school is Frassati Catholic High School in north Harris County; the planners of the school intended for it to serve The Woodlands.

Colleges and universities
The county is also home to two campuses of the Lone Star College System (formerly North Harris-Montgomery Community College District): Montgomery and The University Center.

Lone Star College's service area under Texas law includes, in Montgomery County: Conroe, Magnolia, Montgomery, New Caney, Splendora, Tomball, and Willis ISDs. The portion in Richards ISD is zoned to Blinn Junior College District.

Libraries 
The county operates the Montgomery County Memorial Library System.

Healthcare 
In 1938, the Montgomery County Hospital, a public institution, opened, the first public hospital in the county. It had 25 beds. The Montgomery County Hospital District opened in the 1970s, and the purpose of the district was making a new hospital, which opened in 1982 and replaced the former hospital.

Transportation

Airports
Conroe-North Houston Regional Airport, a general aviation airport, is located in Conroe.

The Houston Airport System stated that Montgomery County is within the primary service area of George Bush Intercontinental Airport, an international airport in Houston in Harris County.

Major highways
  Interstate 45
   Interstate 69/U.S. Highway 59
  State Highway 75
  State Highway 99 - Grand Parkway Toll Road
  State Highway 105
  State Highway 242
  State Highway 249 - a.k.a. MCTRA 249 Tollway (from Spring Creek to Pinehurst) and the Aggie Expressway (Pinehurst up to Todd Mission)

Toll roads

Montgomery County has several toll roads within its borders, most of which are operated as "pass-through toll roads" or shadow toll roads.

There are two "true" toll roads within Montgomery County.  One toll road consists of a section of mainlanes of State Highway 249 between the Harris County line at Spring Creek to FM 1774 in Pinehurst and is signed as MCTRA 249 Tollway (maintained by the Montgomery County Toll Road Authority).  North of Pinehurst, the toll road continues as the TxDOT maintained Aggie Expressway (SH 249 Toll) up north to FM 1774 near Todd Mission then as a two-lane freeway up to State Highway 105 near Navasota.  The other toll road within Montgomery County (also maintained by TxDOT) is Grand Parkway (State Highway 99) between the Harris County line at Spring Creek, with a interchange at I-69/US 59 near New Caney, and reentering Harris County before continuing into Liberty and Chambers Counties.

See also

 List of museums in the Texas Gulf Coast
 Earth Quest Adventures
 National Register of Historic Places listings in Montgomery County, Texas
 Recorded Texas Historic Landmarks in Montgomery County

References

External links
 Montgomery County government's website
 Montgomery County in the Handbook of Texas Online from The University of Texas at Austin
 History of the Lake Creek Settlement and the  Founding of the Town of Montgomery, Texas
 Early History of Montgomery County, Texas
 Lonestar College – The Lone Star College System, formerly known as the North Harris Montgomery Community College District,  is accredited through the Commission on Colleges of the Southern Association of Colleges and Schools (SACS).
 Montgomery County Community Website

 
1837 establishments in the Republic of Texas
Populated places established in 1837
Hurricane Ike
Greater Houston